Cyclic nucleotide-gated channel alpha 1, also known as CNGA1, is a human gene encoding an ion channel protein. Heterologously expressed CNGA1 can form a functional channel that is permeable to calcium. In rod photoreceptors, however, CNGA1 forms a heterotetramer with CNGB1 in a 3:1 ratio. The addition of the CNGB1 channel imparts altered properties including more rapid channel kinetics and greater cAMP-activated current. When light hits rod photoreceptors, cGMP concentrations decrease causing rapid closure of CNGA1/B1 channels and, therefore, hyperpolarization of the membrane potential.

See also
 Cyclic nucleotide-gated ion channel

References

Further reading

External links
  GeneReviews/NCBI/NIH/UW entry on Retinitis Pigmentosa Overview
 

Ion channels